The Dinosaur Beds is a geological formation in Malawi whose strata date back to the Early Cretaceous. The age of the deposit is poorly constrained, but is likely to date from the Barremian to Aptian. Dinosaurs, turtles and crocodyliomorphs remains are among the fossils that have been recovered from the formation. It is correlated with the Galula Formation in Tanzania. It consists of two members, a lower unfossiliferous member consisting of deep red stained sandstones, and an upper fossiliferous member consisting of white sands and grey to red mudstones and siltstones. The upper member is 210 m thick in the vicinity of the CD-9 locality.

Vertebrate paleofauna 
 Karongasaurus gittelmani - A lower mandible and a few teeth
 Malawisaurus dixeyi - "Skull elements, teeth, vertebrae, limb elements osteoderms, of several individuals."
 Malawisuchus mwakasyungutiensis - A skeleton (almost complete articulated skeleton and skull)
 Platycheloides nyasae - A partial shell
Anura indet.
 Theropoda indet.

Invertebrate fauna 

 Hourcqia  a non marine ostracod

See also 
 List of dinosaur-bearing rock formations
 List of fossiliferous stratigraphic units in Malawi

References 

Geologic formations of Malawi
Cretaceous paleontological sites of Africa
Lower Cretaceous Series of Africa
Cretaceous Malawi
Aptian Stage
Barremian Stage
Sandstone formations
Siltstone formations
Mudstone formations
Paleontology in Malawi